"Bowling" is the twentieth episode of the second season of the American comedy television series Malcolm in the Middle and the show's 36th episode overall. The episode originally aired on Fox in the United States on April 1, 2001. The episode was written by Alex Reid and was directed by Todd Holland. The plot serves as a parody of the 1998 film Sliding Doors.

"Bowling" has received positive reviews from critics since airing. Reid and Holland later received Emmy Awards for their work on the episode.

Plot
Malcolm and Reese are preparing for a ten-pin bowling party with some friends from school, but need to be driven there by Lois or Hal. Dewey is being punished for killing a neighbor's parakeet, and one parent must stay home with him. When Lois and Hal are asked who will drive the boys, the screen splits, with Hal offering to take them on one side, and Lois offering on the other. From this point forward, the episode alternates between the realities in which each parent drives.

When Lois takes Malcolm and Reese, she immediately warns them to behave themselves as the bowling alley is one of the few places left the family haven't been banned yet. They immediately arrive at the bowling alley, but as she is buying shoes she notices she only has enough money for one pair of shoes and forces both to share. Right away, both Malcolm and Reese notice a pretty girl named Beth (Alex McKenna) at the party. Lois soon learns that there are no adults chaperoning, then decides to stay and chaperone it herself. Reese impresses Beth, but is repeatedly interrupted by Lois before he can tell her a joke. Malcolm is terrible at bowling, and Lois' overbearing cheering only makes the ridiculing worse. She gives him a lighter ball with the name Connie on it, making everybody call Malcolm Connie. When he finally stands up to her, he only embarrasses himself. Beth has had enough of Reese and her classmates and kisses Malcolm, but Lois breaks it up and takes everyone home. Meanwhile, Dewey tricks Hal into reading him a bedtime story, which he turns on a musical carousel and puts Hal to sleep. Now free to do whatever he wants, Dewey orders pizza, toasts marshmallows and watches R-rated movies on television.

When Hal drives Malcolm and Reese, he gets lost, but they are still excited. When they finally arrive, Hal sends the boys off for a good time while he takes a lane to himself. Reese's joke disgusts Beth, but Malcolm does well at bowling and Beth is impressed with him. Reese gets insanely jealous and tries to throw a bowling ball at Malcolm. He misses and hits a large man, who furiously chases after him. Reese must spend the rest of his evening hiding from the large man. Hal makes a strike and attempts a perfect game by repeating his actions leading up to the strike, attracting a large audience. Malcolm leads Beth to an area behind the pinsetter machines to make out, but his shirt catches in a pinsetter and he tumbles into Hal's lane, ruining the perfect game. He takes Malcolm to the car and orders Reese to get out of the photo booth. He attempts to sneak away, but the large man finds him and takes him back inside the booth. He is able to have pictures of himself beating Reese up as souvenirs. Meanwhile, Dewey cannot fool Lois, but when he appears to have given up she suspects he is up to something. Eventually, Lois allows Dewey to watch television, but only something he will not enjoy: C-SPAN. Neither is sure who won.

In the end, the two realities are shown side-by-side once again, with Hal and Lois simultaneously coming home and saying to their spouse: "Next time, you take them."

Cultural references
The episode's plot serves as a parody of Sliding Doors, in which two different timelines with the same characters are explored. The X-Files had previously done a similar episode, and Dan Harmon used this episode for inspiration of the Community episode "Remedial Chaos Theory".

Reception
"Bowling" has received positive reviews from critics since its airing. The episode was named among The A.V. Club'''s "best TV episodes of the decade" for series that weren't included in their top thirty television series of the decade. The A.V. Club reviewer Emily VanDerWerff praised the episode for its "wild stylistic innovations" and compared, both the series and episode, to The Simpsons''. She went on to praise Jane Kaczmarek and Bryan Cranston's performance in the episode.

In 2009, TV Guide ranked this episode #90 on its list of the 100 Greatest Episodes.

Accolades
The episode won two Primetime Emmy Awards for Outstanding Directing and Writing for a Comedy Series for Todd Holland and Alex Reid, respectively, in 2001. Leading on from this, Holland won the Directors Guild of America Award for Outstanding Directing – Comedy Series in 2002. Frankie Muniz was nominated for the Primetime Emmy Award for Outstanding Lead Actor in a Comedy Series for this episode.

References

2001 American television episodes
Malcolm in the Middle episodes
Emmy Award-winning episodes
Television episodes about multiple time paths